This is a list of choreographers:

A

 Aaliyah
 Paula Abdul
 Kyle Abraham
 Alvin Ailey
 Debbie Allen
 Richard Alston
 Sir Frederick Ashton
 Fred Astaire
 Bob Avian

B

 George Balanchine
 Claude Balon
 Melissa Barak
 Margaret Barr
 Mikhail Baryshnikov
 Aszure Barton
 Steve Barton
 Toni Basil
 Pina Bausch
 Jeanne Beaman
 Pierre Beauchamp
 Paul Becker
 Maurice Bejart
 Bruno Beltrão
 María Benítez
 Michael Bennett
 Busby Berkeley
 Pepsi Bethel
 Zina Bethune
 Mari Bicknell
 Mauro Bigonzetti
 Andy Blankenbuehler
 Walter Bobbie
 Jonah Bokaer
 Chrystelle Trump Bond
 Matthew Bourne
 August Bournonville
 Marc Breaux
 Chris Brown
 Trisha Brown
 Christopher Bruce
 Dana Tai Soon Burgess
 Jean Butler

C

 :pt:António M Cabrita
 Gloria Campobello
 Nellie Campobello
 :pt:São Castro
 Jonathan Stuart Cerullo
 Kate Champion
 Sean Cheesman
 Sidi Larbi Cherkaoui
 Lucinda Childs
 Joyce Ching
 Marie Chouinard
 Paul Christiano
 Ciara
 Martha Clarke
 Jack Cole
 Flick Colby
 Gloria Contreras Roeniger
 Lucia Cormani
 Jean Coralli
 Lillian Covillo
 John Cranko
 Bill Cratty
 Birgit Cullberg
 Merce Cunningham
 Sean Curran

D

 Remo D'souza
 Siobhan Davies
 David Dawson
 Anne Teresa De Keersmaeker
 Yemi Akinyemi Dele
 Agnes de Mille
 Maya Deren
 Marguerite Derricks
 Prabhu Deva
 Tyce Diorio
 Marguerite Donlon
 David Dorfman
 Ulysses Dove
 Tabitha and Napoleon D'umo
 Isadora Duncan
 Katherine Dunham

E

 Hilary Easton
 Eiko & Koma
 Mats Ek
 Alexander Ekman
 Chris Elam
 Jorma Elo
 Parker Esse
 Bill Evans

F

 Garth Fagan
 Molissa Fenley
 Raoul Auger Feuillet
 Michael Flatley
 Maureen Fleming
 Anne Fletcher
 Michel Fokine
 William Forsythe
 Simone Forti
 Bob Fosse
 Celia Franca
 Brian Friedman
 Larry Fuller
 Loie Fuller

G

 Misha Gabriel
 Antonio Gades
 Eddie Garcia
 Jason Gardiner
 Sonia Gaskell
 Jodie Gates
 Kim Gavin
 Jean-Marc Généreux
 Yvonne Georgi
 Laurieann Gibson
 Christopher Gillis
 Béatrice Kombe Gnapa
 Parris Goebel
 Chachi Gonzales
 Len Goodman
 David Gordon
 Martha Graham
 Yuri Grigorovich
 Victor Gsovsky
 Richard Gutierrez

H

 MC Hammer
 Christopher Hampson
 Ciara Harris
 Paul Harris
 Erick Hawkins
 Ganesh Hegde
 Keith Hennessy
 Heike Hennig
 Darrin Henson
 Robert Helpmann
 Mark Herras
 Tatsumi Hijikata
 Robert Hoffman
 Geoffrey Holder
 Saskia Hölbling
 Hollywood Jade
 Hanya Holm
 Lester Horton
 Derek Hough
 Christopher House
 Young Soon Hue
 Doris Humphrey

I
 Nunzio Impellizzeri
 Carrie Ann Inaba
 Ana Itelman

J

 Jay Jackson
 Janet Jackson
 Michael Jackson
 Shobana Jeyasingh
 Bill T. Jones
 Tamsier Joof
 Chris Judd

K

 Geeta Kapoor
 Dan Karaty
 Teet Kask
 Gene Kelly
 Akram Khan
 Farah Khan
 Mudassar Khan
 Saroj Khan
 Michael Kidd
 Jamie King
 Charles Klapow
 Michael Klien
 Theodore Kosloff
 Harry Kramer
 Jiří Kylián
 Pavlos Kourtidis

L

 Noemie Lafrance
 Wayne Lamb
 Tina Landon
 Noemi Lapzeon
 Josefina Lavalle
 Joe Layton
 Douglas Lee
 Ralph Lemon
 Abigail Levine
 Bella Lewitzky
 Daniel Lewis
 Edwaard Liang
 Tanja Liedtke
 José Limón
 Susanne Linke
 Gary Lloyd
 Édouard Lock
 Annabelle Lopez Ochoa
 Murray Louis
 Lar Lubovitch
 Nadine Lustre
 Gillian Lynne

M

 Brian Macdonald
 Blake McGrath
 Nakul Dev Mahajan
 Kenneth MacMillan
 Miriam Mahdaviani
 Russell Maliphant
 Tatiana Mamaki
 Luigi Manzotti
 Susan Marshall
 Cathy Marston
 Léonide Massine
 Sabrina Matthews
 Matt Mattox
 William Matons
 Julianna Rose Mauriello
 Harrison McEldowney
 Gates McFadden
 Wayne McGregor
 Trey McIntyre
 Donald McKayle
 Vaibhavi Merchant
 Ana Mérida
 Sulamith Messerer
 Mia Michaels
 Abby Lee Miller
 Daichi Miura
 Mathilde Monnier
 Mark Morris
 Graeme Murphy
 Mary Murphy

N

 Daniel Nagrin
 Ohad Naharin
 Fernand Nault
 John Neumeier
 Bronislava Nijinska
 Vaslav Nijinsky
 Alwin Nikolais
 Malgorzata Nowacka
 Rudolf Nureyev

O

 May O'Donnell
 Kenny Ortega
 Gideon Obarzanek
 Kazuo Ohno

P

 Veronica Paeper
 Ruth Page
 Stephen Page
 Hermes Pan
 Dimitris Papaioannou
 Steve Paxton
 Travis Payne
 Tom Pazik
 Justin Peck
 Louis-Guillaume Pécour
 Rosie Perez
 Jules Perrot
 Michael Peters
 Marius Petipa
 Roland Petit
 Stephen Petronio
 Arlene Phillips
 Crystal Pite
 Anna Plisetskaya
 Danielle Polanco
 Angelin Preljocaj
 Prabhu Deva

R

 Yvonne Rainer
 Marie Rambert
 Pierre Rameau
 Alexei Ratmansky
 Dwight Rhoden
 Jerome Robbins
 Fatima Robinson
 Wade Robson
 Ginger Rogers
 Pedro Romeiras
 Gunhild Rosén
 David Roussève
 Jeanne Ruddy
 Henning Rübsam
 Raju Sundaram

S 

Sandip Soparrkar
 Ruth St. Denis
 Arthur Saint-Leon
 Marie Sallé
 Ana Sanchez-Colberg
 Karine Saporta
 Margo Sappington
 Liam Scarlett
 Oskar Schlemmer
 Troy Schumacher
 Dave Scott
 Sekhar
 Adam G. Sevani
 Adam Shankman
 Robert Sher-Machherndl
 Rosy Simas
 Stefan Sittig
 Mary Skeaping
 Detlef Soost
 Shane Sparks
 Jody Sperling
 Morleigh Steinberg
 Garry Stewart
 Tatiana Stepanova
 Alyson Stoner
 Susan Stroman

T

 Meryl Tankard
 John Taras
 Sonya Tayeh
 June Taylor
 Paul Taylor
 Lynne Taylor-Corbett
 Tony Testa
 Twyla Tharp
 Lisa Joann Thompson
 John Tiller
 Helgi Tómasson
 Bruno Tonioli
 Chehon Wespi-Tschopp
 Antony Tudor
 Tommy Tune

U
 Jorma Uotinen

V

 Agrippina Vaganova
 Athina Vahla
 Rudi van Dantzig
 Wim Vandekeybus
 Hans van Manen
 Kenneth von Heidecke
 Vyjayanthimala

W

 Travis Wall
 Sasha Waltz
 Leigh Warren
 John Weaver
 Natalie Weir
 Stanton Welch
 Christopher Wheeldon
 Onna White
 Mary Wigman
 Suzy Willson
 Nina Winthrop
 Douglas Wright
 Peter Wright
 Rebecca Wright
 Kimberly Wyatt
 Leni Wylliams

X
Xander Perish

Y
 Dharmesh Yelande
 Nellie Yu Roung Ling

Z
 Vladimir Mikhailovich Zakharov

See also
 Dance

 
Dance-related lists
Lists of people by occupation